Tomas Noriel Joson III (May 10, 1948 – July 23, 2020) was a Filipino politician from the first district of Nueva Ecija, Philippines. He served as a Governor of Nueva Ecija for one term from 1992 to 1995, and was re-elected for another three terms from 1998 to 2007.

In 2019, Joson was found guilty of three counts of graft over donated vehicles to the towns of Quezon and Bongabon in 2007, and sentenced to between six and ten years' imprisonment for each count.

In 2020, Joson was acquitted.

Personal life and death
Joson married, businesswoman, Mary Ann Filart; the couple had five children.

Joson died on July 23, 2020, in Cabanatuan at the age of 72.

References

External links
Province of Nueva Ecija

Governors of Nueva Ecija
1948 births
2020 deaths
Filipino Roman Catholics
Tagalog people
People from Cabanatuan
People from Nueva Ecija
20th-century Filipino lawyers
San Beda University alumni
PDP–Laban politicians
Deaths from the COVID-19 pandemic in the Philippines